Osher is a Hebrew name, a variant of Asher. Notable people with the name include:

Given name
Daniel Osher Nathan
Marion Osher Sandler
Osher Davida
Osher Günsberg
Osher Weiss
Osher Zeitun
Osher Zilberstein

Surname
Barbro Sachs-Osher
Bernard Osher
Katherine Osher, married name of Kathy Read, English swimmer
Laurie Osher
Stanley Osher

See also

Hebrew-language surnames